Alexander Ian Hogg (born 1 August 1937) is an English actor.

Early life 
Hogg was born in Newcastle upon Tyne, Northumberland, the son of Ena Mary (Robinson) and Walter Alexander Hogg, a doctor. He was educated at Durham School and Durham University (St John's College), where he graduated in 1959 with a Bachelor of Arts degree. He then studied at the Central School of Speech and Drama under the direction of Yat Malmgren and later joined the Royal Shakespeare Company. He has an older sister called Thelma Hogg (Hoggie).

Television, stage and film 
He is best known for his lead role in the BBC1 television series Rockliffe's Babies and its follow-up Rockliffe's Folly, playing Detective Sergeant Alan Rockliffe. However, he has played many television roles, appearing as Purishkevich in the film Rasputin: Dark Servant of Destiny (1996), as Mike Cherry in EastEnders (1999) and as Alois Hitler in Hitler: The Rise of Evil (2003). Hogg played a chechaquo (newcomer) to the Yukon in To Build A Fire, the film of Jack London's short story, in 1969.  He played the role of Edmund in Peter Brook's 1971 film version of Shakespeare's King Lear, and his other film credits include Marat/Sade (1967), Tell Me Lies (1968), The Last Valley (1971), The Hireling (1973), Dead Cert (1974), Hennessy (1975), The Legacy (1978), Lady Jane (1986), Little Dorrit (1987) and The Pleasure Principle (1992). He also appeared in the BBC's second dramatisation of Charles Dickens' Bleak House as Inspector Bucket (1985) and in the science fiction television series Doctor Who as the villain Josiah Samuel Smith in the 3-part serial Ghost Light (1989). He has also been associated with Doctor Who by voicing the part of General Voshkar in The Sandman, a spin-off Doctor Who audio drama produced in 2002 by Big Finish Productions. In 2002, he played the role of Ian Lane in the second episode of the first series of Foyle's War, entitled "The White Feather". In the summer of 2008, he played in repertory in Scarborough, North Yorkshire at the Stephen Joseph Theatre under the artistic direction of Alan Ayckbourn. In 2010, Hogg appeared as the sensitive protagonist Murray in the Student Academy Award nominated short, The Miserables. He played Sam in the drama film Sink (2018).

References

External links
 
 

1937 births
Living people
Male actors from Newcastle upon Tyne
People educated at Durham School
Alumni of the Royal Central School of Speech and Drama
English male stage actors
English male film actors
English male television actors
Alumni of St John's College, Durham